The Hyundai ix20 is a car manufactured and marketed by Hyundai, which debuted at the 2010 Paris Motor Show. A mini MPV, the ix20 is a rebadged variant of the Kia Venga, sharing platforms with the Hyundai i20 and Kia Soul. The ix20 is exclusively sold in Europe, and is the replacement for the Lavita/Matrix.

Overview
The ix20 employed styling marketed by Hyundai as its "Fluidic Sculpture" design language.

Powertrain

Petrol
 1.6 —

Diesel
 1.4 CRDi — 
 1.6 CRDi —

References

External links

Ix20
Mini MPVs
Compact MPVs
Cars introduced in 2010
Cars of the Czech Republic
2010s cars